Mehmet Vasıf Yakut (born 15 March 1989) is  a Turkish Para Taekwondo practitioner. He obtained a quota for participation at the 2020 Summer Paralympics in Tokyo, Japan.

Private life 
Mehmet Vasıf Yakut was born in Gevaş district of Van, Turkey on 15 March 1989. He is disabled resulting from a birth defect.

Sports career 
Yakut began performin para taekwondo after he met a taekwondo practitioner in Istanbul in 2016. He is a member of İstanbul Büyükşehir Belediyespor, where he is coached by Ali Özen. He competes in the sport class K43 +73 kg of Para Taekwondo.

Yakut was admitted to the Turkey national team after he became runners-up and then champion in the national championships.

He won a gold medal at the 2018 European Para Taekwondo Chanpionship in Plovdiv, Bulgaria, and another gold medal at the 2019 World Para Taekwondo Championship in Antalya, Turkey. He took the silver medal at the 2019 European Para Taekwondo Championship in Bari, Italy. He competed at the 2020 Summer Paralympics - +75 kg, and was eliminated in the first round of the repechage match.

References 

1989 births
Living people
Sportspeople from Van, Turkey
Paralympic taekwondo practitioners of Turkey
Turkish male taekwondo practitioners
Taekwondo practitioners at the 2020 Summer Paralympics
21st-century Turkish people